Huánuco is a city in Peru. 

Huánuco may also refer to:

 Huánuco Province, in Peru
 Huánuco Region, same
 Huánuco Airport, the city's airport